Jeffrey Tonja Hurd (born May 25, 1964) is a former American football linebacker in the National Football League for the Dallas Cowboys. He also was a member of the Dallas Texans in the Arena Football League. He played college football at the Kansas State University.

Early years
Hurd attended Lincoln College Preparatory Academy, in Kansas City, Missouri, where he participated in football, basketball, and baseball. He received Kansas City prep athlete of the year honors as a senior.

He accepted a football scholarship from Kansas State University. He was a reserve linebacker in his first two seasons. As a junior, he was named a starter at defensive end, registering 62 tackles and 4 sacks. As a senior, he was moved to defensive tackle, posting 57 tackles and 5 sacks.

He pitched for the baseball team as a freshman, compiling an 0-1 record with a 3.5 ERA.

Professional career

Dallas Cowboys
Hurd was signed as an undrafted free agent by the Dallas Cowboys after the 1987 NFL Draft and was moved to linebacker. He was waived on August 17.

After the NFLPA strike was declared on the third week of the 1987 season, those contests were canceled (reducing the 16 game season to 15) and the NFL decided that the games would be played with replacement players. He was re-signed to be a part of the Dallas replacement team that was given the mock name "Rhinestone Cowboys" by the media. He was a backup at right outside linebacker behind Chris Duliban. He was released on October 26, at the end of the strike. He was re-signed for the last 2 games.

In 1988, he injured his left knee and was placed on the injured reserve list. In 1989, he was switched to defensive end and was placed on the injured reserve list with a right knee injury on August 28. He wasn't re-signed after the season.

Dallas Texans (AFL)
In 1990, he signed with the Dallas Texans of the Arena Football League. He had 12 tackles and 1.5 sacks. In 1991, he collected 32 tackles, 4 fumble recoveries and 3 blocked kicks.

References

1964 births
Living people
Sportspeople from Monroe, Louisiana
Players of American football from Louisiana
American football linebackers
Kansas State Wildcats football players
Kansas State Wildcats baseball players
Dallas Cowboys players
Dallas Texans (Arena) players
National Football League replacement players